Gouripur is a small town in northern Bangladesh. In Gouripur there is an important railway station on the Narayanganj-Bahadurabad Ghat Line. The town is surrounded by several small valleys between high forests.

Gouripur House
Gouripur House is around hundred year old haveli built by then local zamindar Brajendra Kishore Roy Chowdhury. Brajendra Kishore Roy Chowdhury and his son Birendra Kishore Roy Chowdhury, were known for their interest in Indian classical music.

Post partition property seems to be owned by Sonali Bank Bangladesh.

Places Of interest
 Shrine of Nizam Aulia
 Fort of Bokai
Nagar
 Shrine of Heroine Sakhina
 Tajpur Fort
 Ramgopalpur Zeminder House & The Lion Door
 Gouripur R.K High School
 Gouripur Govt. College

See also
 List of cities and towns in Bangladesh

References

Populated places in Mymensingh District